This is a list of services by MSN, the web portal and collection of Internet services by Microsoft:

Current services 
 MSN, the web portal and series of apps
 MSN Dial-up, the Internet service provider (originally The Microsoft Network)
 MSN Games, a casual gaming website

Rebranded 
 Bing, a web search engine (previously MSN Search)
 Bing Ads, a business advertising service (previously MSN adCenter)
 Bing Maps, a maps website (previously MSN Expedia Maps and MSN Virtual Earth)
 Bing Shopping, a shopping website for online products (previously MSN Shopping)
 Messenger, an instant messaging service (previously MSN Messenger Service)
 Microsoft account, a user login service (previously MSN Passport)
 Outlook.com, a webmail and calendar service (previously MSN Hotmail and MSN Calendar)
 Windows Live, the umbrella name under which several MSN services were rebranded
 Windows Live Messenger, an instant messaging client (previously MSN Messenger)

Divested by Microsoft 
 Expedia, a travel website
 MSNBC, a cable TV news channel
 NBCNews.com, a U.S. and world news website (previously msnbc.com)
 Nine.com.au, a localized version of the web portal in Australia (previously ninemsn)
 Sidewalk.com, a local event and city search website
 Slate, an online magazine

Discontinued 
 MSN Chat, a chat service and client
 MSN China, a localized version of the web portal in China
 MSN Companion, a personal computer terminal
 MSN Desktop Search, a search program for Windows
 MSN Direct, a radio service for electronic devices
 MSN Encarta, an encyclopedia
 MSN Groups, a collection of online communities
 MSN Music, a music service
 MSN QnA, a question-and-answer website
 MSN Soapbox, a video service
 MSN Spaces, a collection of blogs and personal websites
 MSN Toolbar, an add-on for Internet Explorer
 MSN TV, a set-top box for televisions
 MSN WiFi Hotspots, a service for locating Wi-Fi availability
 Xinmsn, a localized version of the web portal in Singapore

External links 
 
 MSN Worldwide

MSN

es:Anexo:Sitios web de Microsoft#MSN y sus servicios